Tim Prendergast is a Paralympian athlete from New Zealand competing mainly in category T13 middle distance events.

Biography
At eight years of age Tim Prendergast began losing his sight, and within five years his vision had depleted by over 90 per cent. Despite this and the troubles he experienced whilst he was coming to terms with his impairment.

Success was not a given, and Prendergast tried and failed in many races as a junior. In his final year at Wellington College, Prendergast received a standing ovation from the crowd at the McEvedy Shield in honour of commitment to the sport. In 2004 Prendergast represented New Zealand at his second Paralympic Games in Athens, winning a gold medal in the T13 800 metres contest. He also ran in the Beijing Games in 2008 where he was suffered from heat exhaustion and didn't win any medals.  At London 2012 Prendergast ran his fastest time at a major championship but was edged out of the medals.

Now in his seventh year as an Athlete Mentor, Prendergast hopes that sharing his own experience of overcoming disability to succeed will inspire the pupils he meets to overcome their own obstacles.

Prendergast, now as mentioned, an Athlete Mentor, visits many schools in England to share his stories of success and hardship, and continues to motivate many.

In March 2013 Tim Prendergast's wife, Lisa, gave birth to baby boy Finn. Then two years later in August 2015 Lisa gave birth to another child, Will.

In 2018 at the London Marathon, Tim was second in the T13 marathon.

Tim retired from International athletics following the 2018 London Marathon. He is still passionate about running despite being plagued by stress fractures in his lower leg.

References

External links 
 
 

Paralympic athletes of New Zealand
Athletes (track and field) at the 2000 Summer Paralympics
Athletes (track and field) at the 2004 Summer Paralympics
Athletes (track and field) at the 2008 Summer Paralympics
Paralympic gold medalists for New Zealand
Paralympic silver medalists for New Zealand
Living people
Athletes (track and field) at the 2012 Summer Paralympics
Medalists at the 2000 Summer Paralympics
Medalists at the 2004 Summer Paralympics
New Zealand male marathon runners
New Zealand male middle-distance runners
Year of birth missing (living people)
Paralympic medalists in athletics (track and field)